Austro Aéreo was an Ecuadorian airline that operated scheduled passenger services throughout Ecuador.

History
 

The company was inaugurated on November 11, 1996. The airline offered regular flights between the cities of Cuenca. Macas, Quito and Guayaquil. Austro Aereo had a limited number of planes and had many problems with them. Its only aircraft, a Fairchild FH-227, was grounded because it failed a "major inspection". The repair costs would have been very high, so Austro Aéreo opted not to repair it and instead acquired two new Embraer EMB 120 Brasilias.

The company got into financial difficulties in 2002 and stopped flying to Guayaquil in December. Three million dollars were owed to the sellers of the  aircraft, the suppliers of the Pratt & Whitney engines, the Ecuadorian Institute of Social Security and the tax authorities. 107 employees losing their jobs and the company was put into liquidation on December 31, 2003.

Destinations

Cuenca (Mariscal Lamar International Airport) Hub
Guayaquil (José Joaquín de Olmedo International Airport)
Quito (Old Mariscal Sucre International Airport)

Fleet
2 Embraer EMB 120 Brasilia
1 Fairchild FH-227

See also
List of defunct airlines of Ecuador

References

Defunct airlines of Ecuador
Airlines established in 1996
Airlines disestablished in 2003
1996 establishments in Ecuador
2000s disestablishments in Ecuador
Companies disestablished in 2003